Marek Glezerman (born January 1, 1945) is an Israeli obstetrician and gynecologist.

He is a Professor Emeritus of Obstetrics and Gynecology and head of Gender Medicine at the Sackler School of Medicine, Tel Aviv University. He is also the chair of the Ethics Committee at the Sackler School of Medicine, director of the Research Center for Gender Medicine at the Rabin Medical Center, founding president of the Israel Society for Gender Medicine and immediate past-president of the International Society for Gender Medicine. He has been head of The Helen Schneider Hospital for Women at Rabin Medical Center. Glezerman is also a member of the Ministry of Health's National Council for Obstetrics and Gynecology, Genetics and Perinatology as well as a member of the Advisory Council for Gynecological Oncology and on the Advisory Council for Andrology in the International Federation of Gynecology and Obstetrics (FIGO). He is considered as one of the pioneers of gender and sex conscious medicine.

Academic and medical career
Glezerman studied initially medicine, psychology and philosophy at Goethe University in Frankfurt, Germany, continued his medical studies at the Université de Paris and completed his studies of medicine at Goethe University. In the early 70s Glezerman immigrated to Israel, settled in Tel Aviv and performed his post graduate studies at Tel Aviv University. He did fellowships and sabbaticals at the Weizmann Institute of Science in Rehovot, Israel and in Germany, Spain, Canada, and the United States in different fields. In 1986 Glezerman was appointed to the position of associate professor at Ben-Gurion University of the Negev in Beersheba, Israel, and was promoted to full professor in 1991. He served as the Deichman-Lerner Chair of obstetrics and gynecology in Beersheba and later as the Emma Fein Chair for obstetrics and gynecology in Tel Aviv. He also served as vice dean of the faculty of health sciences and vice director of the post graduate school of medicine, both at Ben-Gurion University. After founding and heading the unit of gynecological oncology at Soroka Medical Center in Beer Sheba, he served for 8 years as the chairman of the division of obstetrics and gynecology.

He later directed the Gynecology and Obstetrics Department at the Wolfson Medical Center in Holon and from 2005 until his retirement he was head of the Departments of Obstetrics and Gynecology at Beilinson Hospital and Hasharon Hospital and deputy director of the Rabin Medical Center. Glezerman founded and served as the director of the Research Center for Gender Medicine at the Rabin Medical Center until 2014. He served for fourteen years as chair of the National Steering Committee of Obstetrics and Gynecology at the Maccabi Healthcare Services.

In 2010 Glezerman received the Athena Award from The Foundation for Gendered Medicine for “leadership in the science of gender-specific medicine".

Research and Publications 
Glezerman has published five books on the topics of obstetrics and gynecology and will publish his sixth book in the summer of 2016. He has published hundreds of papers spanning the topics of fertility, obstetrics and gynecology.

Private life 
Marek Glezerman lives in Israel, is married and has three daughters and five grandchildren.

Selected works
Lunenfeld B, Glezerman M. Diagnose und Therapie, männlicher Fertilitätsstörungen. Berlin, Grosse Verlag, 1981.
Glezerman M, Jecht E (eds.). Varicocele and Male Infertility II. Springer, Berlin-Heidelberg-New York-Tokyo, 1984.
Glezerman M  e al  Placebo controlled trial of topical interferon in labial and genital herpes reduces frequency of recurrences in labial and genital herpes: Double blind placebo controlled and phase IV trials. Lancet 1:150-152, 1988.
Lunenfeld B, Insler V, Glezerman M. Diagnosis and treatment of functional infertility. Completely revised edition. Berliner Medizinische Verlagsanstalt, Berlin,1993
Glezerman M et al.: A model of efficient and continuous quality improvement in a clinical setting. Int J for Quality in Health Care. 11: 227-232,1999.
Glezerman, Marek. "Five years to the term breech trial: the rise and fall of a randomized controlled trial." American journal of obstetrics and gynecology 194.1 (2006): 20-25.
Glezerman M. Gender Medicine. Overlook  2016

References

External links 
 The Israeli Society for Gender Medicine
 The International Society for Gender Medicine
 "Sex and Sickness" - An interview with Marek Glezerman in the Haaretz newspaper from March 18, 2011
 "Marek Glezerman - The Science of Gender Medicine" - An audio interview with Marek Glezerman on the Inquiring Minds podcast

Academic staff of Tel Aviv University
1945 births
Living people
Israeli gynaecologists